Richard Updike Sherman (1819–1895) was a New York State politician and newspaper publisher and editor. He was also the father of US Vice President James S. Sherman.

Richard Sherman was:
Editor, Oswego Daily Times & The Herkimer Journal (1844–46)
Owner/editor of Rochester Daily Evening Gazette (1847)
Co-owner/editor Utica Morning Herald (1847–82)
Brigadier general, New York State militia (1841–57)
Clerk of the New York State Assembly, from  January 7, 1851, to January 6, 1857 (Whig, later Republican)
Member of the New York State Assembly (Oneida Co., 1st D.) in 1857 (as a Republican), 1875 and 1876 (both as a Democrat)
 a delegate to the New York State Constitutional Convention of 1867–68
Assistant clerk, U.S. House of Representatives (1870)
Secretary, New York State Fish and Game Commission (1879–1890)
 Trustee, New Hartford Cotton Company - he restocked the lakes of the Adirondack Mountains area with fish; also protected the forests from unscrupulous lumber dealers
President, New Hartford Canning Company, established in 1880.

Marriage
He married his distant cousin Mary Frances Sherman. They had
six children: 
Richard W., a civil engineer and two-term Mayor of the City of Utica, New York
Stalham W., Superintendent and Treasurer of New Hartford Canning Co., who died in 1894
Mary Louise, wife of Henry J. Cookinham (a law partner of James Schoolcraft Sherman)
James Schoolcraft Sherman, 27th vice president of the United States
Sanford F., Owner of S. F. Sherman, Men’s Furnishings, a very prominent house devoted to the sale of that class of goods for men’s wear popularly known as men’s furnishings, which he established in 1878.
Willet H., who died in New Hartford in 1868, aged six.

References

History of the Mohawk Valley - Gateway to the West - 1614-1925 -
Abridged Compendium, Frederick Virkus, p. 2,934
Biographical Directory of the American Congress, 1774–1949, Biographies.
Cheater.com, 31 July 2000
Dictionary of American Biographies, Charles Scribner and Sons, 1935.
Genealogical Library Master Catalog. New York State Library, Albany, NY.
History of Oneida County New York, from 1700 to the Present Time, Vol.I, by Henry J. Cookinham, Chicago: The S.J. Clarke Publishing Company, 1912.
Robert W. Cherny, "Sherman, James Schoolcraft." Discovery Channel School, original content provided by World Book Online, 31 July 2000.

“The Mercantile and Manufacturing Progress of the City of Utica, N.Y. and Environs” by the Merchants’ and Manufacturers’ Exchange of Utica, N.Y., published by Commerce Publishing Company, 1888.

1819 births
1895 deaths
Members of the New York State Assembly
19th-century American newspaper publishers (people)
19th-century American newspaper editors
American male journalists
Clerks of the New York State Assembly
Fathers of vice presidents of the United States
New York (state) Whigs
19th-century American politicians
New York (state) Republicans
New York (state) Democrats
19th-century male writers
Sherman family (U.S.)